Live 2015 may refer to:

Live 2015 (Belle and Sebastian album)
Live 2015, album by Cinerama (band)